The 2010 Giro d'Italia Femminile or 2010 Giro Donne was the 21st running of the Giro d'Italia Femminile, one of the premier events of the women's road cycling calendar. It was held over ten stages from 2–11 July 2010, starting in Muggia and finishing in Monza. It was won by Mara Abbott of USA National Team, the first American ever to win the Giro Donne.

Teams
Sixteen teams with 8 riders each were invited to the Giro d'Italia Femminile, for a total of 128 starting positions.  However, several teams started short by a rider or two, so the start of the race only featured 120 riders.

The invited teams were:
 Australia National Team (7 riders)
 Bizkaia–Durango (6 riders)
 
 Chirio–Forno d'Asolo
 Debabarrena–Kirolgi (6 riders)
 Fenixs–Petrogradets (6 riders)
 Gauss–RDZ–Ormu
 Lotto Ladies Team (7 riders)
 Michela Fanini–Record–Rox
 Safi–Pasta Zara
 Netherlands National Team
 
 Team Valdarno
 Top Girls Fassa Bortolo-Ghezzi
 USA National Team
 Vaiano-Tepso-Solaristech

Route and stages

Classification leadership
There were five different jerseys awarded in the 2010 Giro Donne. In general, these followed the same format as those in the men's Giro d'Italia.

The leader of the General classification received a pink jersey. This classification was calculated by adding the combined finishing times of the riders from each stage, and the overall winner of this classification is considered the winner of the Giro.

Secondly, the points classification awarded the maglia ciclamino, or mauve jersey. Points were awarded for placements at stage finishes as well as at selected intermediate sprint points on the route, and the jersey would be received by the rider with the most overall points to their name.

In addition to this, there was a mountains classification, which awarded a green jersey. Points were allocated for the first few riders over selected mountain passes on the route, with more difficult passes paying more points, and the jersey would be received by the rider with the most overall points to their name.

Fourth, there was the jersey for the Best Young Rider, which was granted to the highest-placed rider on the General classification aged 23 or under. This rider would receive a white jersey.

Finally, there was the jersey for Best Italian Rider, awarded to the Italian rider placed highest in the general classification.  This rider would receive a blue jersey.

In addition to the jerseys, an award was given for Best Team.  This result was determined by adding the total times of each team's top three riders at the finish of each stage.

Classification standings

General classification

Points classification

Mountains classification

Young rider classification

Italian rider classification

References

External links
Cycling News

Giro d'Italia Femminile
Giro d'Italia F
Giro d'Italia Femminile